Brentnall is a surname. Notable people with the surname include:

Bev Brentnall (born 1936), New Zealand cricketer
Frederick Thomas Brentnall (1834–1925), English-born Australian Wesleyan preacher and politician
Greg Brentnall (born 1956), Australian rugby league footballer
Lyndon Brentnall, security company owner, RMS Protective Services
Sandra Brentnall (born 1962), Australian soccer player 
Thomas Brentnall (1846–1937), English-born Australian chartered accountant